Lojze Kozar Sr. (born Kozár Alajos, November 11, 1910 – April 29, 1999), was a Slovene Roman Catholic priest, writer, and translator. He was the uncle of the priest, writer, and poet Lojze Kozar Jr.

References

1910 births
1999 deaths
20th-century Slovenian writers
20th-century Slovenian Roman Catholic priests
Prekmurje Slovenes
Servants of God